Thomas "Tommy" Williamson (born May 5, 1999) is an American professional soccer player who plays as a forward for Loudoun United in the USL Championship.

Career

Youth
Williamson was born in Anaheim Hills, California. He played youth soccer as part of the USSDA academy team Strikers FC in Irvine, forgoing playing high school soccer for Villa Park High School. Williamson was in the top 10 in his division's scoring table during the 2015-16 season, scoring 18 goals in 34 games and tallying 12 assists. He graduated with a 4.3 GPA and accepted a scholarship to play soccer for the University of California, Berkeley

College & Amateur
In three full seasons with the Golden Bears, Williamson scored 9 goals and tallied 1 assists in 45 appearances, earning All PAC-12 Honors in 2019. Williamson also was selected as a Pac-12 All-Academic Honorable Mention in 2018. Williamson missed his senior season in 2020 due to the Pac-12 Conference been cancelled due to the COVID-19 pandemic. In 2021, He graduated with a B.A. in Legal Studies.

In 2018, Williamson appeared for USL PDL side Orange County SC U23.

Professional
On January 21, 2021, Williamson was drafted 12th overall in the 2021 MLS SuperDraft by San Jose Earthquakes. On April 23, 2021, Williamson was officially signed by the Earthquakes. The same day he was sent on a season-long loan to USL Championship side Pittsburgh Riverhounds.

Williamson made his professional debut on May 8, 2021, starting against Tampa Bay Rowdies, becoming the first player in Riverhounds history born after the club's formation. On June 15, 2021, he scored his first professional goal in a 1-0 away win against Indy Eleven. Williamson scored the first of two goals in a 2-0 win against Tampa Bay Rowdies, clinching a spot for the Riverhounds in the 2021 USL Championship Playoffs. He ended his rookie season with 6 goals and 4 assists.

Following the 2021 season, San Jose declined their contract option on Williamson.

On February 8, 2022, Williamson signed with MLS Next Pro side Minnesota United 2 ahead of their inaugural season.

On December 13, 2022, it was announced that Williamson would join USL Championship side Loudoun United for the 2023 season.

References

External links

University of California, Berkeley profile

1999 births
American soccer players
Association football forwards
California Golden Bears men's soccer players
Living people
Loudoun United FC players
Orange County SC U-23 players
People from Anaheim Hills, California
Pittsburgh Riverhounds SC players
San Jose Earthquakes draft picks
San Jose Earthquakes players
Soccer players from California
American people of Iranian descent
Sportspeople of Iranian descent
USL Championship players
USL League Two players